Utah State Route 5 may refer to:

 Utah State Route 5 (1962-1977), the former state highway designation (legislative overlay) for Interstate 215 in Salt Lake County, Utah, United States
 Utah State Route 5 (1920s-1962), the former state highway designation (and mostly legislative overlay) for several roads along what is now a section of U.S. Route 89 and roughly a section of the corridor for Interstate 84 in Weber, Morgan, and Summit counties in Utah, United States, that ran from Ogden to Echo Junction

See also

 List of state highways in Utah
 List of Interstate Highways in Utah
 List of U.S. Highways in Utah
 List of named highway junctions in Utah
 List of highways numbered 5

External links

 Utah Department of Transportation Highway Resolutions: Route 5 (PDF)